Alive Alive-o! is an album by Puerto Rican guitarist José Feliciano, released in 1969.

Released at the apex of Feliciano's career, the album reached No. 29 on the Billboard albums chart. It was one of the few double albums of that time to get "Gold" certification in the United States.  The album reached no. 19 in Canada, no. 1 in the Netherlands, no. 4 in Spain and was a hit in other countries as well.  It was recorded live in London at the London Palladium Theatre on April 21, 1969.

Track listing
"God Save the Queen" (Traditional; arranged by Westerly Garde)
"Hi-Heel Sneakers (Robert Higginbotham)
"Rain" (José Feliciano, Hilda Feliciano)
"Malagueña" (Ernesto Lecuona)
"El Jinete" (José Alfredo Jiménez)
"Nobody Knows You When You're Down and Out" (Jimmy Cox)
"El Voh" (Dorival Caymmi)
"The Comedy Bit"
"Guantanamera" (Joseíto Fernández; original words by José Martí; adapted and arranged by Westerly Garde)
"No Dogs Allowed" (José Feliciano, Hilda Feliciano)
"Mama Don't Allow It" (Cow Cow Davenport)
"Don't Let the Sun Catch You Crying" (Gerry Marsden, Freddie Marsden, Les Chadwick, Les Maguire)
"Day Tripper" (John Lennon, Paul McCartney)
"A Day in the Life" (John Lennon, Paul McCartney)
"Medley: Felicidade (Antônio Carlos Jobim) / Samba de Orfeu (Luiz Bonfá) / Manhã de Carnaval (Luiz Bonfá)
"California Dreamin (John Phillips, Michelle Phillips)
"Light My Fire" (Robbie Krieger, Jim Morrison, Ray Manzarek, John Densmore)
"La Entrada de Bilboa (Battle of Entrada)" (José Feliciano)

Personnel
José Feliciano – 12-string guitar, 6-string guitar, percussion effects, vocals
Paulinho Magalhães – drums
Brian Brocklehurst – bass
Peter Ahern – percussion
Vic Lewis – presenter

Charts

Certifications

References

1969 live albums
José Feliciano albums
RCA Records live albums
Albums produced by Rick Jarrard
Albums recorded at the London Palladium